Gelechia clopica is a moth of the family Gelechiidae. It is found in Argentina.

References

Moths described in 1931
Gelechia